Keith Carter (born 16 October 1952) is a Canadian gymnast. He competed in seven events at the 1976 Summer Olympics.

References

1952 births
Living people
Canadian male artistic gymnasts
Olympic gymnasts of Canada
Gymnasts at the 1976 Summer Olympics
Sportspeople from Winnipeg